Abdul Mu'iz bin Sisa (born 20 April 1991) is a Bruneian professional footballer who plays for DPMM FC and the Brunei national team as a left-sided full-back. He previously played for Indera SC where he won the first two Brunei Super League championships in 2012–13 and 2014.

Club career
Abdul Mu'iz rose through the ranks from the youth system of Indera SC. He appeared regularly at left back for Indera starting from the 2007-08 season, winning the Bruneian league championship twice and the Piala Sumbangsih once.

Abdul Mu'iz was granted the opportunity to play for Brunei's sole professional side DPMM FC in 2016 after a season-ending injury to Sairol Sahari forced the Gegar Gegar men to look for a local left-back to provide additional cover to the position. Already an established Bruneian international, he joined in June 2016 after a successful trial.

Abdul Mu'iz made his DPMM debut on 26 September 2016 against Young Lions in a 5–3 win.

On 4 December 2022, Abdul Mu'iz played in the final of the 2022 Brunei FA Cup where he was taken off injured at the half-hour mark. His team won the match 2–1 against Kasuka FC, bringing Abdul Mu'iz his first FA Cup winner's medal.

International career

Abdul Mu'iz started his international career with the under-21 side of the national team. He was an unused squad player for the 2007 Hassanal Bolkiah Trophy, but appeared in every match for the 2012 edition, winning the trophy on home soil.

Abdul Mu'iz next laced up with the under-23 team for the 27th SEA Games held in Myanmar in December 2013. Brunei lost every game to finish rock bottom of their group.

Abdul Mu'iz was selected for the 2018 World Cup qualifying First Round for AFC two-legged clash against Chinese Taipei in March 2015. He started both legs in a 1-2 aggregate loss. He appeared in friendlies against Singapore and Cambodia later that year, scoring with a chip in the former game.

Abdul Mu'iz was selected by the national team for the 2018 AFF Suzuki Cup qualification matches against Timor-Leste in early September. He came on in the second half of the first leg which was a 3-1 loss in Kuala Lumpur on 1 September. He was a starter at left-back in the return leg at Hassanal Bolkiah National Stadium the following week, the match resulted in a 1-0 win which was not enough to send Brunei to the group stages of the Suzuki Cup.

In June 2019 Abdul Mu'iz was to be recalled to the national team by Robbie Servais for the 2022 World Cup qualification matches, but he decided to decline due to unspecified reasons.

Abdul Mu'iz was selected for the Wasps for the two-legged 2022 AFF Mitsubishi Electric Cup qualifying matches against Timor-Leste in Bandar Seri Begawan in early November 2022. He started the second match which was a 1–0 loss to Brunei but still advanced to the group stages via a 6–3 aggregate win. He played twice in the tournament against the Philippines and Cambodia, both games ending 5–1 to the opponent.

International goals
Scores and results list Brunei's goal tally first.

Honours

Team
Indera SC
Brunei Super League (2): 2012–13, 2014
DPMM FC
Singapore Premier League: 2019
Brunei FA Cup: 2022

International
Brunei national under-21 football team
Hassanal Bolkiah Trophy: 2012

Individual
 
  Meritorius Service Medal (PJK) (2012)

External links

References 

1991 births
Living people
Association football fullbacks
Bruneian footballers
Brunei international footballers
Indera SC players
Place of birth missing (living people)
Competitors at the 2013 Southeast Asian Games
Southeast Asian Games competitors for Brunei